Camden County High School may refer to:

Camden County High School (Georgia)
Camden County High School (North Carolina)